Al Ansar Football Club was the women's team of the Lebanese association football club Ansar. Founded in 2007 as one of the first women's teams in Lebanon, Ansar withdrew their women's team prior to the 2011 season.

History 
Ansar's women's team began their activities on 17 April 2007.

Honours 
Lebanese Women's FA Cup
Runners-up (2): 2007–08, 2008–09

See also 
 Al Ansar FC
 Lebanese Women's Football League
 Women's football in Lebanon
 List of women's association football clubs in Lebanon

References

Al Ansar FC
Defunct football clubs in Lebanon
Women's football clubs in Lebanon
2007 establishments in Lebanon
2010 disestablishments in Lebanon
Association football clubs established in 2007
Association football clubs disestablished in 2010